Fantômas is an American heavy metal supergroup formed in 1998 in California. It features vocalist Mike Patton (Faith No More, Mr. Bungle), drummer Dave Lombardo (ex-Slayer), guitarist Buzz Osborne (Melvins) and bassist Trevor Dunn (Mr. Bungle, Tomahawk). The band is named after Fantômas, a supervillain featured in a series of crime novels popular in France before World War I and in film, most notably in the '60s French movie series.

History 
Fantômas began just before the collapse of Faith No More, as a series of spasmic, avant-garde metal/grindcore songs composed by vocalist and bandleader Mike Patton. Patton then sent the demos to guitarist Buzz Osborne (of Melvins), bass guitarist Trevor Dunn (of Mr. Bungle) and drummer Igor Cavalera (of Sepultura), with the intention of forming a supergroup. Cavalera declined the offer, but recommended who he thought would be perfect for the project: Dave Lombardo of Slayer, who accepted. The band have released all of their albums through Patton's independent label Ipecac, however there was initially interest from several prominent record labels, primarily due to Patton's commercial success with Faith No More. He recalled "There was a whole lot of interest, at first. People from Geffen and stuff like this came out to the shows. But after the show, they disappeared into the woodwork. There were [also] indies that were interested, but none that I was interested in."

In mid-2005, the band toured Europe with Terry Bozzio on drums, as Lombardo was on tour with Slayer. Lombardo returned to the band for the final dates of the tour, which concluded on September 15, 2005.

On May 13, 2006, Patton revealed to Billboard.com that a fifth Fantômas album was being planned. Of the album, Patton says, "The next record is going to be an all-electronic affair. It's going to take some creative planning on how to record it and execute it, but there will be no acoustic instruments on it whatsoever. We're pretty much about to go into hibernation mode. I need to, once I have a little time, go back to the drawing board and start writing the next one." In November 2008, Rock-A-Rolla, a UK-based alternative music magazine, exclusively revealed on their website that the new album was currently being worked on and a tentative June 2009 release was possible, however, in the May 2009 issue of Rock-A-Rolla, in an interview with Greg Werckman, Werckman stated that Mike "hasn't even begun" recording the next Fantômas record.

On July 21, 2011, Rock-A-Rolla revealed that Fantômas would be releasing their December 31, 2008, performance at San Francisco's Great American Music Hall as a DVD and a standalone audio download, titled The Director's Cut Live: A New Year's Revolution. On September 16, 2014, Ipecac Recordings announced that on Record Store Day they would be releasing a boxset titled "Wunderkammer," which would contain all of the Fantômas albums on vinyl as well as a cassette featuring Mike Patton's original demos for the band.

In December 2014, Fantômas played their first shows in six years as part of the Rockout Festival in Santiago, Chile, however no plans have been announced to date regarding a new studio recording.

On June 24, 2017, Fantômas reunited to open for Tool's concert in San Bernardino, California. Due to his touring commitments with Suicidal Tendencies, Dave Lombardo could not perform at the show. Melvins' Dale Crover returned to take Lombardo's place for the performance.

Style 

Though rooted in avant-garde metal, Fantômas' music touches on many different musical genres, making liberal use of experimentalism and noise. Fantômas' music is also noted for its absurdism and offbeat sense of humor; one critic dubbed their style "dada-metal", a reference to the "anti-art" dada movement of the early 1900s.

Patton rarely sings conventional lyrics with the group, preferring his own bizarre style of voice music or scat singing.

The band arrange albums around concepts or themes:

 Fantômas is based on science fiction comic books, with every song simply given a page number ("Page 1", "Page 2", etc.). The artwork was mainly taken from the Italian comic Diabolik.
 The Director's Cut is a series of reinterpretations of motion picture theme songs. Some versions are rather loyal to the sources (such as the eerie lullabye from The Night of the Hunter), while others offer radical takes on the music (such as the theme from The Godfather, tackled in part as an extreme metal song).
 Delìrium Còrdia is one extended song, with the concept of surgery without anesthesia.
 Suspended Animation is an album of twisted cartoon music, each track named after a day in the month of April 2005, and the limited-edition, first pressing of the album was itself (literally) a calendar of the month featuring the art of contemporary Japanese pop artist Yoshitomo Nara.

Non-album songs 

Fantômas have recorded a few songs which do not appear on their albums:

 "Chariot Choogle" (1:51) – A cover of the song by T.Rex, featured on the Marc Bolan tribute album Great Jewish Music: Marc Bolan. Mike Patton recorded this cover and attributed it to Fantômas.
 "Zemaraim" (3:36) – A version of the song which John Zorn had originally written for his band, Masada, but never performed or recorded. To celebrate Masada's 10th Anniversary, John Zorn organized the release of an album known as The Unknown Masada; Fantômas contributed this song to the release. The song was arranged by Trevor Dunn, and is one of the only songs by Fantômas not to have been written or arranged by Mike Patton.
 Where Is the Line (Fantômas Remix) (5:28) – Released as a B-side on Björk's "Where Is the Line" vinyl release.
 "Animali in calore surriscaldati con ipertermia genitale" (0:44) – Released on the Fantômas / Melt-Banana split, through Unhip Records, in 2005. The cover art was drawn by Italian artist Igort.
 "SKETCHBOOK 1" -  This is rough demos of songs from the album Fantômas. These songs come from the same session as the Chariot Choogle cover and were largely used to send to the remaining members to learn the songs. Page 20, 16, 26, 9, 15, 2, 19, 25 and 7 were released on the Sugar Daddy Live split release with the Melvins. Page 1-30 were released on a cassette as part of the Wunderkammer box set.

Legacy 
Progressive rock band Tool cited Fantômas as a major influence on their 2006 record 10,000 Days. In 2006, Mastodon cited several experimental bands, among them Fantômas, as an inspiration to expand their sound into new directions. Dan Briggs, bassist for Between the Buried and Me, called it "a big part of [his] musical background" and considers the Wunderkammer box set one of his most valuable records.

Nu metal band Slipknot was heavily influenced by Fantômas in its beginning. The whole band, who was already a fan of Mike Patton, attended one of their first shows in 1998 before Fantômas released any music and were astounded by their technical prowess, calling them the tightest band they had seen. Its drummer Joey Jordison said that the work of Dave Lombardo on Fantômas should be known by every drummer. Mushroomhead frontman Jason Popson called it his favorite band in 2000.

Other bands influenced by Fantômas are CKY, The Locust and Car Bomb. Known fans of it included actor Danny DeVito, writer Alan Moore and dance music artist Moby.

Members 
 Current members
 Mike Patton – vocals, synthesizers, keyboards, melodica, sampling
 Buzz Osborne – guitar, vocals
 Trevor Dunn – bass guitar, backing vocals
 Dave Lombardo – drums, percussion

 Touring members
 Dale Crover – drums, percussion, backing vocals

 Former live members
 Terry Bozzio – drums, percussion

Discography

Studio albums

Live albums

Split releases

Video albums

Compilation albums

See also 
List of ambient music artists

References

External links 
 
 

American experimental rock groups
American alternative metal musical groups
Alternative metal supergroups
American avant-garde metal musical groups
Heavy metal musical groups from California
Musical groups established in 1998
 
Ipecac Recordings artists